Vitus Tinnitus is a live EP by Archers of Loaf, their first officially released live recording. It was released in 1997. The first six tracks were recorded live at The Middle East in Cambridge, MA, on October 26, 1996. The last two tracks are remixes from All the Nations Airports.

Track listing

 "Harnessed In Slums"
 "Underdogs Of Nipomo"
 "Greatest Of All Time"
 "Form and File"
 "Audiowhore"
 "Nostalgia"
 "Vocal Shrapnel (Remix)"
 "Scenic Pastures (Remix)"

References

1997 EPs
Archers of Loaf albums
Alias Records albums
Live EPs
1997 live albums